Sir Agravain is a Knight of the Round Table in Arthurian legend, whose first known appearance is in the works of Chrétien de Troyes. He is the second eldest son of King Lot of Orkney with one of King Arthur's sisters known as Anna or Morgause, thus nephew of King Arthur, and brother to Sir Gawain, Gaheris, and Gareth, as well as half-brother to Mordred. Agravain secretly makes attempts on the life of his hated brother Gaheris since the Vulgate Cycle, participates in the slayings of Lamorak and Palamedes in the Post-Vulgate Cycle, and murders Dinadan in the Prose Tristan. In the French prose cycle tradition included in Thomas Malory's Le Morte d'Arthur, together with Mordred, he then plays a leading role by exposing his aunt Guinevere's affair with Lancelot, which leads to his death at Lancelot's hand.

In the traditional, albeit contested, division of the massive medieval prose Lancelot portion of the Vulgate Cycle into three or four parts, the last section is named after Agravain. Despite giving his name to the section, Agravain plays only a minor part in most of its stories.

Arthurian legend 
The earliest known appearance of Agravain, as Engrevain the Proud (Old French: li Orgueilleus, modern French: l'Orgueilleux), is found in Chrétien de Troyes' 12th-century romance poem Perceval, the Story of the Grail in which he is one of Gawain's brothers and is also known as the one "with the hard hands" (aus dures mains). The poem's anonymous First Continuation describes him as very quarrelsome. In Sir Gawain and the Green Knight, where he is called Agravain of the Hard Hand, he is named in a list of respectable knights. This, combined with his unobjectionable depiction in Chrétien's original Perceval, suggests his reputation might not have been very negative prior to his characterisation in the prose cycles.

In the Lancelot-Grail (also known as the Vulgate Cycle) prose works, Agravain is generally portrayed as a handsome man, taller than Gawain, and a skilled fighter. However, unlike his heroic brothers Gawain and Gareth, Agravain is known for malice and villainy, yet sometimes capable of heroic deeds. In the Prose Lancelot part of the Vulgate Cycle, Agravain is described as taller than Gawain and with a "somewhat misshapen" body. As "a fine knight" but "arrogant and full of evil words [and] jealous of all other men," he "was without pity or love and had no good qualities, save for his beauty, his chivalry [knightly values], and his quick tongue."

In Jean Froissart's Méliador, Agravain courts and marries Florée, a cousin of Princess Hermondine of Scotland, after winning her tournament at Camelot. In Thomas Malory's Le Morte d'Arthur, Arthur marries him to Laurel, a niece of Lynette and Lyonesse.

Narratives 
A major motif regarding Agravain's character in the prose romances is his one-sided conflict with his younger brother, Gaheris, in addition to his rivalry with Gawain. According to the Vulgate Merlin, Gawain and his two full brothers came to court together as squires and were knighted together. When Agravain brags to his brothers that he would make love to an unwilling damsel if he wanted, Gaheris responds with mockery, and Agravain attacks him, only to be knocked down by Gawain who admonishes Agravain for his proud ways and bullying nature. In the later version in the Post-Vulgate Cycle, Gaheris is ordered by Merlin to seek out and free Gawain from captivity. Feeling that Merlin always unfairly favoured Gaheris, Agravain is very jealous and declares that he could rescue Gawain just as good or better than he, yet it is Gawain who achieves the quest. A prophecy says that Gaheris must be knighted first and then he should knight his brothers, however Agravain still insists that he must be knighted only by King Arthur himself, relying on his age. He then follows secretly his younger brother, who set out on a quest, determined to prove that he is a better knight than Gaheris and to once and for all settle this issue by cutting his brother's head off. Yet Gaheris defeats the incognito Agravain twice (including still beating up his attacker in an ambush while unprepared and weary from an earlier fight), failing to learn his mysterious opponent's true identity in the process but nevertheless making Agravain stop trying to kill him by making clear he is in fact vastly superior to him. Years later, upon learning that Gaheris has murdered their mother Morgause, Gawain swears to avenge her. Agravain, for though he had loved his mother, hated Gaheris more and so was glad to see that his brother had done such a deed for which he hoped to see Gaheris put to death. But when Agravain and his half-brother Mordred are at the point of beheading Gaheris, Gawain stops them as he believes that they should not shame themselves by killing one who was their brother. The four later attack Morgause's lover Lamorak and they kill him after an unfair fight of all of them at once against one.

The so-called "Agravain" section of the Vulgate Cycle's Prose Lancelot begins with some minor adventures of Agravain. In one of them, he slays the evil lord Druas the Cruel. The Prose Lancelot ascribes an important adventure of Lancelot which is here retold in the order in which it is supposed to have occurred, rather than the textual order which includes explanations told by Agravain at the end. It tells of Agravain being cursed by two damsels on separate occasions, one for wounding a knight in his in arm and then joking about it and another for trying to force himself on her and then commenting on seeing her infected leg. Later, he learns that his love, the daughter of King Tradelmant of North Wales, is seeking for him to rescue her, for her father has bestowed her on a knight whom she does not want to marry. Agravain manages to win her for himself and joins the Duke of Cambenic who gives him a castle. He then lives there with her and with his young half-brother Mordred, who at that time is still a squire. But a curse affects Agravain's left arm and the other his left leg, leaving him to greatly suffer until these limbs are anointed with the blood of the best knight alive as well as of the second-best. They decide to send for Gawain but also to seek out the mysterious Black Knight (the incognito Lancelot) that saved Arthur's throne from Galehaut. A messenger brings Gawain who agrees to give blood that heals Agravain's leg, showing that Gawain is the second-best knight alive. Gawain then finds and persuades Lancelot to give his blood, which does its job, proving that Lancelot is indeed the best knight in the world.

In the Post-Vulgate Grail Quest, Agravain and Gawain (the latter villainized within the Post-Vulgate Cycle compared to his usual portrayals) come upon wounded Palamedes. Palamedes protests that he is now a Knight of the Round Table like them and so they should not fight him, but Gawain cares nothing of their Pentecostal Oath and attacks, joined by Agravain. However, when their opponent is beaten down to near death, Agravain asks Gawain to hold back, which is the only time within the cyclic prose romances when he shows compassion. When Gawain refuses to listen and beheads Palamedes anyway, Agravain says he is grieved because Palamedes was such a good knight and, more practically, because this deed will be hard to conceal. In the Prose Tristan, after the end of the Grail Quest, Agravain and Mordred, who both hate Dinadan, see him coming wounded outside Camelot and decide it as a good time to take vengeance, as Arthur's court believes that Dinadan is still in Cornwall. Dinadan manages to fight them off, but they return to attack him again within the sight of Camelot. Dinadan is now too weak to stand up to both of them and so Mordred quickly knocks him from his horse and Agravain finishes him off. Lying, they later claim the dying Dinadan was mistaken in blaming them for the attack and it must have been some other knights who murdered him. In Malory's telling, Agravain also insists on fighting Tristan together with Gaheris. In this combat, Tristan severely wounds Agravain and calls the Orkney brothers (sans Gareth) the most notorious murderers of good knights in Arthur's realm.

Death

In the Vulgate Cycle and in works based on it, Agravain is one of the knights who realises that Lancelot and Queen Guinevere are secret lovers (in the Vulgate, he and his brothers are told of that by their aunt, Morgan). His envy and hatred of Lancelot lead him to believe that they should tell King Arthur about this. When Arthur happens to wander into the argument, he demands to know what it is that he should not be told about. Agravain tells Arthur about Lancelot and Guinevere; a plot is hatched according to which Arthur will go hunting all night without taking Lancelot. Agravain, with Mordred and a group of knights, will keep watch on the king's wife in order to entrap Lancelot when he comes to her and so prove the accusation. This results in Agravain's death, but the details vary depending on the telling.

In the English poem Stanzaic Morte Arthur and in Malory's Le Morte d'Arthur, the trapped Lancelot attacks the knights who have lain in wait and kills almost all of them, including Agravain. In the Vulgate Mort Artu, however, Lancelot only kills one knight (Tanaguins) and the rest, in fear, refuse to attack Lancelot. Agravain is then among the nobles who sentence Guinevere to be burned at the stake, and Arthur tells Agravain to pick knights to serve as a guard during the burning. Agravain agrees, but insists that Arthur order Gaheris to accompany him as one of the party. When Lancelot and his party attack, Lancelot, riding ahead of the others, charges deliberately at Agravain, whom he recognises, and strikes him though his body with his lance. When King Arthur finds Agravain dead, he falls to the ground in a faint, and says (in Norris J. Lacy's modern English version of the Lancelot-Grail): "Oh, fair nephew, how he hated you who stuck you so! Everyone must know that he who deprived my kinsmen of such a knight as you are has inflicted terrible grief on me." Agravain's body is then buried in a very rich tomb in the church at Camelot.

Modern adaptations
By and large, modern works based on Arthurian legend continue to villainize Agravain.
 Agravaine, not Gaheris, as in Malory, is the Orkney brother responsible for the murder of his mother in what may be the most widely read 20th-century adaptation of the Arthurian legend: T. H. White's The Once and Future King series of books, first released in 1938. White portrays Agravaine as a drunken, bloodthirsty coward, the brutal "bully" of his family, but also intelligent and not altogether unsympathetic.
 The pre-Raphaelite poem "The Defence of Guenevere" (1858) by William Morris also identifies Agravaine as his mother's murderer.
 In the short-story "Sir Agravaine", from P.G. Wodehouse's The Man Upstairs and Other Stories (1914), the character Sir Agravaine the Dolorous is presented as an unattractive man of little distinction as a knight, characterised by self-doubt and a defeatist attitude, but intelligent and finally successful.
 He appears in the British TV series Merlin (2008–2012) in Series 4 as Arthur's contemptuous uncle Agravaine de Bois; while purporting to help guide the prince after his father is incapacitated, Agravaine secretly works with Morgana to overthrow the Pendragons and return her to the throne, presumably acting out of revenge for the deaths of his siblings ("Tristan" and "Ygraine") at hands of King Uther. He is finally killed by Merlin in the Season 4 finale after he helps Morgana attack Camelot.
 Conversely, the 1995 movie First Knight presents Agravain (portrayed by Liam Cunningham) as heroic, an atypical treatment which can be traced to a curious anomaly in Malory; though consistently depicted as an outspoken enemy of the queen, Agravain is nonetheless chosen as one of Guinevere's knights when she rides out on May Day (a journey that begins the episode dealt with in the film). He is loyal to Arthur and Guinevere and survives at the final battle against Malagant and his army.
 In the video game Fate/Grand Order, Agravain (voiced by Hiroki Yasumoto) is portrayed as a spy for his mother Morgan who grew to be truly loyal to King Arthur. He is a misogynist due to how Morgan treated him, initially unaware that his king is also a woman. This hateful disposition towards women is made worse after his discovery of Guinevere's affair with Lancelot. It is stated that he kept the Round Table united in their dislike of him, and that his death marked the beginning of Camelot's fall.

See also

 9503 Agrawain, an asteroid named after Agravain.

Notes

References

External links
Agravaine at The Camelot Project

Arthurian characters
Fictional characters who committed sedition or treason
Fictional murderers
Fictional princes
Fictional rapists
Knights of the Round Table
King Arthur's family